Rigi Staffel railway station is a railway station at  on Rigi at the junction of the rack railways Arth–Rigi Railway and Vitznau–Rigi Railway, just below the terminus Rigi Kulm. It is located in the municipality of Arth, canton of Schwyz, Switzerland.

Layout
Rigi Staffel has two side platforms and two tracks, one serving the Arth–Rigi line and one serving the Vitznau–Rigi line.

Services
 the following services stop at Rigi Staffel:

References

External links
 
 

Railway stations in the canton of Schwyz
Rigi Railways stations
Railway stations in Switzerland opened in 1873